In Greek mythology, Aenete was the daughter of Eusorus, and wife of Aeneus, by whom she had a son, Cyzicus, the founder of the town of this name. In some traditions she is called Aenippe.

Mythology

Apollonius' account 

 "And about the isthmus and the plain the Doliones had their dwelling, and over them Cyzicus son of Aeneus was king, whom Aenete the daughter of goodly Eusorus bare."

Orphic Argonautica 

"Cyzicus, the son of Aeneus who ruled over all the Doliones, came up and took a place among the heroes. He had been born to a most noble woman, Aenete, daughter of Eusorus."

Notes

References 

Apollonius Rhodius, Argonautica translated by Robert Cooper Seaton (1853-1915), R. C. Loeb Classical Library Volume 001. London, William Heinemann Ltd, 1912. Online version at the Topos Text Project.
Apollonius Rhodius, Argonautica. George W. Mooney. London. Longmans, Green. 1912. Greek text available at the Perseus Digital Library.
Bell, Robert E., Women of Classical Mythology: A Biographical Dictionary. ABC-Clio. 1991. .
The Orphic Argonautica, translated by Jason Colavito. © Copyright 2011. Online version at the Topos Text Project.

Women in Greek mythology
Characters in Greek mythology